Aleksandr Kozlov may refer to:

 Aleksandr Kozlov (hammer thrower) (born 1952), Soviet hammer thrower
 Aleksandr Kozlov (footballer) (1993–2022), Russian professional association football player with FC Spartak Moscow
 Aleksandr Kozlov (politician, born 1949), Russian politician
 Alexander Kozlov (born 1981), Russian politician